Attridge is a surname. Notable people with it include:

Derek Attridge (born 1945), British professor of English
Florence Attridge (1901–1975), British woman
Gus Attridge, South African businessman
Harold W. Attridge (born 1946), American professor of divinity